The Adventures of Clint and Mac is a 1957 television serial that aired on ABC as part of the third season of The Mickey Mouse Club. It was filmed on location in London, England.

Plot
Clint is an American boy living in London while his father is stationed there with the United States Air Force.  He's formed a friendship with Mac, his neighbor, whose father is a Scotland Yard Inspector.  The serial, taking place over the course of a single day, portrays their involvement in the theft of the original manuscript of the novel Treasure Island and their attempts to return it to its rightful owners.

Cast and characters
Neil Wolfe as Clint Rogers
Jonathan Bailey as Alistair "Mac" MacIntosh
John Warwick as Inspector MacIntosh
Dorothy Smith as Mac's Mother
Bill Nagy as Clinton Rogers, Sr.
Mary Barclay as Clint's mother
Sandra Michaels as Pamela Stuart
George Woodbridge as Toby Jug
Eric Phillips as Constable Hawkins

Episodes
 "An Introduction" (Dec 30, 1957)
 "The Day Begins" (Dec 31, 1957)
 "The Mysterious Bookshop" (Jan 1, 1958)
 "The Strange Character" (Jan 2, 1958)
 "The Forgotten Clue" (Jan 3, 1958)
 "Looking For Trouble" (Jan 6, 1958)
 "A Call For Help" (Jan 7, 1958)
 "The Chase" (Jan 8, 1958)
 "The Meeting of the Pirates" (Jan 9, 1958)
 "The Getaway Boat" (Jan 10, 1958)
 "The Unseen Watchers" (Jan 13, 1958)
 "Dangerous Journey" (Jan 14, 1958)
 "Pamela Takes a Hand" (Jan 15, 1958)
 "The Signal" (Jan 16, 1958)
 "A Battle Royal" (Jan 17, 1958)

References

External links

Television series by Disney
The Mickey Mouse Club serials
1957 American television series debuts
1958 American television series endings
Black-and-white American television shows
Television shows set in London
Treasure Island
English-language television shows